Eric Leme Walther Maleson is Brazil’s first Olympic Bobsled pilot and Curler. He is considered the father of ice sports in Brazil. He is also the founder and former President of the Brazilian Ice Sports Federation (CBDG). He was born in Rio de Janeiro, Brazil. Maleson competed at the 2002 Winter Olympic Games in Salt Lake City (4-man bobsled event), has served on the International Luge Federation (FIL) Development Committee (2002–2006), and was also a member of the International Bobsleigh and Skeleton Federation's (IBSF) Court of Arbitration (2006–2010).

Maleson was voted one of the top ten most influential sports figures in Brazil (2002) and was the first Brazilian athlete to carry the Olympic Torch during the Salt Lake City torch relay event in Cambridge, Massachusetts, USA (December 2001).

In September 2010, Maleson was elected Vice President of Communications of the International Bobsleigh & Skeleton Federation, becoming the first South American elected to the Board of an International Winter Olympic Federation. 

He won three career bronze medals at Americas Cup bobsled races (2000, 2001).

The Brazilian Post Service issued a Bobsled stamp to celebrate the historic first Olympic qualification.

1967 births
Living people
Bobsledders at the 2002 Winter Olympics
Brazilian male bobsledders
Brazilian people of Belgian descent
Olympic bobsledders of Brazil
Sportspeople from Rio de Janeiro (city)
Brazilian people of German descent

External links

A Curling Team Proves Not All Brazilian Sweepers Play Soccer

Eric Maleson to carry Olympic Torch

International Olympic Committee Results

Eric Walther Maleson of Brazil was voted onto the IBSF board as vice president of communications

Patriot Ledger, South Shore Olympic athletes